Physical Review Accelerators and Beams is a monthly peer-reviewed open-access scientific journal, published by the American Physical Society. The journal focuses on accelerator physics and engineering. Its lead editor is Frank Zimmermann (CERN). The journal was established in 1998 as Physical Review Special Topics – Accelerators and Beams, obtaining its current title in 2016. The journal does not require article processing charges, being sponsored by academic and industrial institutions.

Abstracting and indexing 
The journal is abstracted and indexed in:
Current Contents/Physical, Chemical & Earth Sciences
Inspec
Science Citation Index Expanded
Scopus
According to the Journal Citation Reports, the journal has a 2021 impact factor of 1.879.

References

External links

American Physical Society academic journals
Publications established in 1998
English-language journals
Monthly journals
Particle physics journals
Creative Commons Attribution-licensed journals